"Magic in the Air" is a 2014 single by Ivorian musical group Magic System.

Magic in the Air may also refer to:

Albums
Magic in the Air, a 1978 live album by Lindisfarne
Magic in the Air, a 1990 album by The Attack

Songs
"Magic in the Air", song by The Three Degrees single from New Dimensions, 1979
"Magic in the Air", song by Badly Drawn Boy from 2000 album The Hour of Bewilderbeast
"Magic in the Air", song by Kings of Convenience
"Magic in the Air", also released as "I Feel Something in the Air", song by Cher 1966
"Magic's in the Air," song by Esther Phillips, 1976